Alberto Palatchi (born 1949/1950) is a Spanish billionaire businessman, and the former owner of the wedding dress company Pronovias.

Career
In 1964, Palatchi inherited a store from his parents. He grew the business into Pronovias, one of the largest wedding dress companies in the world.

In October 2017, Palatchi sold 90% of wedding dress company Pronovias, founded by his father in 1922, to British private equity firm BC Partners, for an estimated US$550–655 million.

As of March 2018, Forbes estimated his net worth at US$1.1 billion.

Personal life
He was married to Susana Gallardo, who is now married to Manuel Valls. According to Forbes he is "separated", with three children, and lives in Madrid, Spain.

References

Living people
Spanish billionaires
Year of birth missing (living people)
Businesspeople from Madrid